Medical biology is a field of biology that has practical applications in medicine, health care and laboratory diagnostics. It includes many biomedical disciplines and areas of specialty that typically contains the "bio-" prefix such as:
 molecular biology, biochemistry, biophysics, biotechnology, cell biology, embryology,
 nanobiotechnology, biological engineering, laboratory medical biology,
 cytogenetics, genetics, gene therapy,
 bioinformatics, biostatistics, systems biology, 
 microbiology, virology, parasitology,
 physiology, pathology, 
 toxicology, and many others that generally concern life sciences as applied to medicine.

Medical biology is the cornerstone of modern health care and laboratory diagnostics. It concerned a wide range of scientific and technological approaches: from an in vitro diagnostics to the in vitro fertilisation, from the molecular mechanisms of a cystic fibrosis to the population dynamics of the HIV, from the understanding molecular interactions to the study of the carcinogenesis, from a single-nucleotide polymorphism (SNP) to the gene therapy.

Medical biology based on molecular biology combines all issues of developing molecular medicine into large-scale structural and functional relationships of the human genome, transcriptome, proteome and metabolome with the particular point of view of devising new technologies for prediction, diagnosis and therapy.

See also

External links

References 

Clinical medicine
Biomedicine